Arthur Boileau (born October 9, 1957) is a long-distance runner, who represented Canada at two consecutive Summer Olympics in the men's marathon. At the 1984 Summer Olympics in Los Angeles, California, he finished in 44th and four years later in Seoul, South Korea he placed 28th. He is a two-time winner of the Los Angeles Marathon, winning in both 1987 and 1989. Boileau also finished 2nd in the 1986 Boston Marathon. Born in Edmonton, Alberta, Boileau is currently a resident of North Vancouver, British Columbia.

Achievements

See also
 Canadian records in track and field

References

External links
 
 
 
 
 
 
 

1957 births
Living people
Athletes (track and field) at the 1984 Summer Olympics
Athletes (track and field) at the 1988 Summer Olympics
Canadian male long-distance runners
Franco-Albertan people
Olympic track and field athletes of Canada
Athletes (track and field) at the 1986 Commonwealth Games
Commonwealth Games competitors for Canada
World Athletics Championships athletes for Canada
Athletes from Edmonton